Tom Dougherty (May 30, 1881 – November 6, 1953), nicknamed "Sugar Boy", was a baseball pitcher for the Chicago White Sox in 1904. He is perhaps unique for his 'perfect' 1-0 winning record where he faced 6 batters over 2 innings without giving up any hits, walks or runs in the one game he pitched.

Notes

 Baseball Reference

Chicago White Sox players
1953 deaths
1881 births
Major League Baseball pitchers
St. Paul Saints (AA) players
Atlanta Crackers players
Monroe Hill Citys players
Milwaukee Brewers (minor league) players
Baseball players from Chicago